The following is a list of Nigerian actors of Yoruba descent.

Actors 
 Femi Adebayo
 Odunlade Adekola
 Jide Kosoko
 Adebayo Salami
 Taiwo Hassan

Actresses 
 Ronke Ojo
 Mercy Aigbe
 Toyin Abraham
 Funke Akindele
 Iyabo Ojo
 Dayo Amusa
 Fathia Balogun
 Toyin Abraham
 Bukky Wright
 Foluke Daramola-Salako

References 

Actors